Alysha Burnett (born 4 January 1997) is an Australian athlete competing in the heptathlon. She won a silver medal at the 2017 Summer Universiade.

International competitions

Personal bests
Outdoor
200 metres – 25.51 (+1.2 m/s, Sydney 2017)
800 metres – 2:27.45 (Taipei 2017)
100 metres hurdles – 14.13 (+0.7 m/s, Townsville 2019)
High jump – 1.91 (Canberra 2019)
Long jump – 6.34 (+2.0 m/s, Sydney 2014)
Shot put – 14.41 (Sydney 2021)
Javelin throw – 48.71 (Sydney 2016)
Heptathlon – 5835 (Taipei 2017)

References

External links
 Alysha Burnett at Athletics Australia
 

1997 births
Living people
Australian heptathletes
Athletes from Sydney
Athletes (track and field) at the 2018 Commonwealth Games
Commonwealth Games competitors for Australia
Universiade silver medalists for Australia
Universiade medalists in athletics (track and field)
Competitors at the 2019 Summer Universiade
Medalists at the 2017 Summer Universiade
21st-century Australian people